Lim Kim Choon  is a Singaporean civil servant and former major-general who served as Chief of Air Force between 2001 and 2006.

After leaving the Air Force in 2006, Lim served as the chief executive officer and director-general of the Civil Aviation Authority of Singapore (CAAS) between 2007 and 2009.

Education
Lim was awarded the Singapore Armed Forces (SAF) Overseas Scholarship in 1977 and graduated from Loughborough University with a Bachelor of Science (Second Upper Class Honours). He also holds a Master of Science in management from the MIT Sloan School of Management. He attended the Air Command and Staff Course in the United States. He attended the six-week Advanced Management Program in Harvard Business School in 2009.

Military career
Lim enlisted in the Singapore Armed Forces (SAF) in 1976 and served in the Air Force as an F-16 pilot. Throughout his military career, he held various appointments, including: Head, Air Intelligence Department; Head, Air Operations Department; Commander, Tengah Air Base; Chief of Staff, Air Staff (1998–2001). He was appointed as the Chief of Air Force on 1 April 2001. During his tenure as Chief, the Air Force acquired many new systems, such as the F-15SG, AH-64 Apache and SH-60 Seahawk. Lim also directed the Air Force's involvement in humanitarian assistance operations, including: Operation Flying Eagle in Aceh, Indonesia in 2005; Singapore's response in the aftermath of Hurricane Katrina in the U.S. in 2005.

Lim retired from the SAF on 24 March 2006 and was succeeded by Ng Chee Khern as the Chief of Air Force.

Post-military career
Lim joined the Civil Aviation Authority of Singapore as its Senior Deputy Director-General from May 2006 to July 2007 before serving as Director-General and Chief Executive Officer from July 2007 to 2009. Lim was appointed as a Non-Executive and Non-Independent Director of Stratech Systems on 19 May 2011. He is also a member of the boards of various governmental organisations, including: Changi Airports International; Singapore Technologies Aerospace; Singapore Aerospace Manufacturing; Ascott Group.

Awards
 Public Administration Medal (Military) (Gold) 
 Long Service Medal (Military)

References

|-
 

|-

Living people
Singaporean civil servants
Singaporean military leaders
Chief of the Republic of Singapore Air Force
Alumni of Loughborough University
Singaporean chief executives
MIT Sloan School of Management alumni
1958 births